The 1901 Penn Quakers football team was an American football team that represented the University of Pennsylvania as an independent during the 1901 college football season. In its tenth season under head coach George Washington Woodruff, the team compiled a 10–5 record and outscored opponents by a total of 203 to 121. Significant games included victories over Penn State (23–6), Chicago (11–0), and Carlisle (16–14), and losses to Navy (6–5), Harvard (33–6), and Army (24–0).

Two Penn players received recognition on the 1901 College Football All-America Team: guard John Teas (Walter Camp, 3rd team); and halfback Marshall S. Reynolds (The Philadelphia Inquirer, 1st team).

Schedule

References

Penn
Penn Quakers football seasons
Penn Quakers football